Esther Doughty Luckhardt (née Schwertfeger; June 18, 1913January 14, 2011) was an American insurance and real estate business owner and Republican politician.  She represented Dodge County in the Wisconsin State Assembly for 22 years (1963–1985).  At the time of her retirement from politics, she had been the longest-serving female member of the Legislature.

Biography

Luckhardt was born Esther Hulda Louise Schwertfeger. She graduated from Horicon High School in Horicon, Wisconsin.  She owned and operated a real-estate and insurance business in Horicon. From 1963 until 1985, Luckhardt served in the Wisconsin State Assembly.

References

|-

People from Horicon, Wisconsin
Businesspeople from Wisconsin
Women state legislators in Wisconsin
1913 births
2011 deaths
20th-century American businesspeople
20th-century American women
21st-century American women
Republican Party members of the Wisconsin State Assembly